Mossis Madu Jr (born November 4, 1987) is a former gridiron football running back. He most recently played for the Ottawa Redblacks of the Canadian Football League (CFL). He was signed by the Tampa Bay Buccaneers as an undrafted free agent in 2011. Mossis played high school football at Norman High School in Norman, where he was raised. After high school, Mossis went on to play college football at Oklahoma.

Professional career

New York Jets
Madu was signed by the New York Jets on August 4, 2013. He was released on August 31, 2013.

Hamilton Tiger-Cats 
Madu signed with the Hamilton Tiger-Cats of the Canadian Football League in time for the 2014 CFL season. In his first season in the CFL Madu was dressed for 15 games, carrying the ball 75 times for 348 yards with 2 touchdowns. He also contributed 44 receptions for 512 yards in the passing game. Madu missed the entire 2015 season with a shoulder injury.

Ottawa RedBlacks 
Following an injury to starting running back William Powell the Ottawa Redblacks signed Mossis Madu. When Travon Van also went down with injuries Mossis Madu became the new starting running back for the Redblacks. Madu played in 6 regular season games during the season, carrying the ball for 490 yards on 92 carries with 3 touchdowns. Madu suffered an injury during the East Division Final and missed the remainder of the contest. Following the game it was announced he would miss the Grey Cup final with a fractured scapula. In 2017 Madu mostly played as the Redblacks backup running back behind William Powell; playing in only seven games, rushing 71 times for 317 yards with 2 touchdowns. In January 2018 Madu and the Redblacks agreed to a one-year contract extension. Madu was limited by injury to the final two games of the year, where he rushed for 104 yards and a score on 25 carries. Madu was signed to a one-year extension several minutes before free agency was to begin on February 12, 2019. He was released by the Redblacks on January 23, 2020.

References

External links
 Oklahoma Sooners bio
 Tampa Bay Buccaneers bio

1987 births
Living people
Sportspeople from Norman, Oklahoma
Players of American football from Oklahoma
American football running backs
Oklahoma Sooners football players
Tampa Bay Buccaneers players
New York Jets players
Ottawa Redblacks players
Hamilton Tiger-Cats players
Canadian football running backs